Morecambe Northumberland Street railway station served the seaside town of Morecambe in Lancashire, England.

History
It opened on 12 June 1848. The station was expanded and the buildings were rebuilt in 1872.

It closed in March 1907 following the opening of Morecambe Promenade. The station remained open to goods before closing at an unknown date and the site has since been redeveloped. Murals can be found depicting it in its heyday.

References

 Northumberland Street Station © Ian Taylor cc-by-sa/2.0 :: Geograph Britain and Ireland

Disused railway stations in Lancaster
1848 establishments in the United Kingdom
1907 disestablishments in the United Kingdom
Railway stations opened in 1848
Railway stations closed in 1907
Former Midland Railway stations
Buildings and structures in Morecambe

Railway stations in Great Britain opened in 1848